Punjab is home to 2.3% of India's population; with a density of 551 persons per km2. According to the provisional results of the 2011 national census, Punjab has a population of 27,743,338, making it the 16th most populated state in India. Of which male and female are 14,639,465 and 13,103,873 respectively. 32% of Punjab's population consists of Dalits. In the state, the rate of population growth is 13.9% (2011), lower than national average. Out of total population, 37.5% people live in urban regions. The total figure of population living in urban areas is 10,399,146 of which 5,545,989 are males and while remaining 4,853,157 are females. The urban population in the last 10 years has increased by 37.5%. According to the 2011 Census of India, Punjab, India has a population of around 27.7 million.

Caste population
As of September 2020, the caste population data for each upper caste citizen in Punjab collected in Socio Economic and Caste Census 2011 has not been released to public by Government of India. Scheduled Castes and Other Backward Classes form 63.2% of the total population of Punjab.

Languages spoken

The Punjabi language written in the Gurmukhi script is the official language of the state. Muslims form a slight majority in the Malerkotla town and use Shahmukhi for communication. Punjabi is the sole official language of Punjab and is spoken by the majority of the population numbering around 24,919,067 constituting (89.82%) of the population as of 2011 census report. Hindi is the second largest language, spoken by 2,177,853 constituting 7.85% of the population. And the remaining 646,418 spoke other Indian languages, comprising 2.83% in the Others category.

Religion in Punjab

2001 and 2011 census 
Sikhism is the most practiced faith in Punjab, practiced by 16 million people representing   57.69% of the population of Punjab population, making it the only Sikh-majority state in India. Around 38.49% of the population i.e. 10.67 million practice Hinduism, while Islam is followed by 5.35 lakhs comprising 1.93% of the state population. Other faiths include Buddhism, Christianity and Jainism.

1941 census

East Punjab province 

Prior to partition, the eastern portion of Punjab that was ultimately awarded to India following the demarcation of the Radcliffe Line was made into a new province – East Punjab. The area includes the contemporary states of Punjab, Haryana, and Himachal Pradesh. Below is the religious demographics of this region broken down by district and princely state with an overall total as per the 1941 Indian census.

Contemporary Punjab state 

The religious demography according to the 1941 census for the region that comprises the contemporary state of Punjab, India is also shown below, broken down by district and princely state with an overall total.

Sikhism in Punjab

Sikhism was born in the Punjab area of South Asia, which now falls into the present day states of India and Pakistan. The main religions of the area at the time were Hinduism and Islam.The Sikh faith began around 1500 CE, when Guru Nanak began teaching a faith that was quite distinct from Hinduism and Islam. Nine Gurus followed Nanak and developed the Sikh faith and community over the next centuries.

The Sikh population in India's Punjab have grown from 5.53 million in 1951 to 16 million in 2011 census (an increase of 10.47 million in last 60 years). Sikhs in Punjab have the lowest fertility rate of 1.6 children per women as per census 2011.

Decadal percentage of Sikhs in Punjab, India

After the 1947 Partition of Punjab, Sikhs became the majority religious group in Indian Punjab mainly due to the immigration of 2 million Pakistani Sikhs into Indian Punjab, which have ultimately resulted in an increase in Sikh percentage from 32.83% in 1941 to 60.62% in 1951.
While population that adheres to Sikh faith has increased, the percentage of Sikhs has declined from 60.62% in 1951 to 57.69% (a decline of 2.93% in last 60 years).

Hinduism in Punjab

Hinduism is the second largest and fastest growing religion in the Indian state of Punjab with around 38.5% followers as of 2011 census. Hinduism is the 2nd largest religion of Punjabi peoples. It was the largest religion in Punjab before the advent of Islam from the West and birth of Sikhism in Punjab region from the east.

Decadal percentage of Hindus in Punjab, India

The Hindu percentage remained stable for decades. The Hindu percentage have increased from 37.66% in 1951 to 38.49% in 2011.

The Hindu population have increased from 3.44 million in 1951 to 10.67 million in 2011 (a growth of 7.23 million in 6 decades). Hindus in Punjab have a fertility rate of 1.9 children per women as per as census 2011.

Islam in Punjab

The Muslim population in the region that comprises the contemporary state of Punjab, India reduced from approximately 37.5% according to the 1941 census to 0.5% in 1947 as a result of Partition of Punjab riots which were caused during 1947 mainly in the various parts of East Punjab.

Prior to partition, according to the 1941 census, approximately 3.8 million Muslims resided in the region that forms the contemporary state of Punjab in India. At the time, Muslims formed the largest religious community in the region, comprising a narrow plurality at approximately 37.5 percent of the total population. Following the partition of India, the vast majority numbering around 3.71 million departed the region en masse, migrating westward to the Punjab region that fell on the western side of the Radcliffe Line, in the contemporary state of Punjab, Pakistan. 

Most native Punjabi Muslims now live in Malerkotla, and it is the only district where communal violence haven't occurred during partition because Guru Gobind Singh Ji have promised the Nawab of Malerkotla, Sher Mohammad Khan that the Muslim community in Malerkotla would never be harmed in the future times to come and as a result of Guru ji's blessing words, most of the Muslims were able to stayed back there. Apart from Malerkotla, most of the Muslims living in other parts of Punjab are non-native and have came from neighbouring states of Uttar Pradesh, Haryana, Rajasthan, Jammu & Kashmir on temporary basis as immigrants workers (small scale) and students. 

Muslims in Punjab have a fertility rate of 2.4 children per women as per 2011 census. Islam is the fastest-growing religion in Punjab.

Decadal percentage of Muslims in Punjab, India

Religious population by districts

See also
Punjabis
Sikhs
Punjabi Hindus
Punjabi Muslims

Notes

References

Punjab, India
Punjab